Drumkeen is a village and townland in County Donegal, Ireland. The village population was 193 at the 2016 census. The local soccer club, Drumkeen United, play at St Patrick's Park. The village is located just above the Burn Dale, which flows along the southern edge of the village.

References

Towns and villages in County Donegal
Townlands of County Donegal